Deh-e Sardar (also Romanized as Deh-e Sardār; also known as Qal‘eh-e Sardār and Qal‘eh Sardār) is a village in Howmeh Rural District, in the Central District of Lamerd County, Fars Province, Iran. At the 2006 census, its population was 22, in 5 families.

References 

Populated places in Lamerd County